Mitsusada Umetani (2 December 1880 - 27 September 1936) was a Japanese Home Ministry and Police Bureau government official. He was born in Hyōgo Prefecture. He was a graduate of the University of Tokyo. He was governor of Yamanashi Prefecture (1923-1924) and Nagano Prefecture (1924-1926).

References

External links 

 Letters from Mitsusada Umetani

1880 births
1936 deaths
Politicians from Hyōgo Prefecture
Japanese Home Ministry government officials
Japanese Police Bureau government officials
Members of the Government-General of Taiwan
University of Tokyo alumni
Governors of Nagano
Governors of Yamanashi Prefecture